Charles-Henri Pourquet, born Henri Charles Justin Pourquet (14 August 1877 – 1943) was a French sculptor.

Life 
Born in Colombes, the son of a baker, Pourquet had Nivernais origins and was a student of Louis-Ernest Barrias and Jules Coutan at the École des beaux-arts de Paris. In 1907, he became a member of the Société des artistes français

Among other works, is "Orpheus at the tomb of Eurydice", a bas-relief which will then be acquired by the State for the new National Conservatory of Music, a monument dedicated to Jules Renard in Chitry-les-Mines (Nièvre) where the writer lived as a child, and the Tombeau de la famille Sabaterie, in the Arlanc (Puy-de-Dôme) cemetery. He remarried at the town hall of the 18th arrondissement on 5 November 1921, with Valentine Saint-Selve.

Awards 
 Chevalier of the Légion d'honneur in 1931.
 Gold medal at the 1929 Salon.

Salons 
 Salon des artistes français: 
 1925: Maréchal Sérurier, stone statue, commissioned by the State.
 1928: Statue de mon jeune ami Jean Le Blond, plaster; Tristesse, terracotta statuette.
 1935: M. Renaitour, député-maire d'Auxerre, plaster, M. Ortiz, président des Amis de la Légion.

Works 
 Chitry: Monument to Jules Renard , destroyed in 1942.
 Lormes: Résistance, Poilu blocking the enemy's way, at the top of the War Memorial.

Critical reception 
 In May 1919, the magazine L'Art funéraire devoted a complimentary article to him with a photograph on the front page. Each issue, since its publication, has been used to advertise him and describes him as a "statuary of pain".

References

Bibliography 
 Benezit Dictionary of Artists
 André Roussard,  Dictionnaire des peintres à Montmartre, Paris, éditions Roussard, 1999, .
 Bernard Morot-Gaudry, La sculpture en Morvan au XXe siècle et début du XXIe, 2017, Éditions , bulletin , .
 Maurice Le Blond, L'Œuvre de Charles-Henri Pourquet, statuaire, 1921.

External links 

 POURQUET Charles-Henri 
 Les œuvres commémoratives du sculpteur Pourquet
 Monuments aux morts de Normandie et d'ailleurs

1877 births
People from Colombes
1943 deaths
20th-century French sculptors
École des Beaux-Arts alumni
Chevaliers of the Légion d'honneur
World War I memorials in France